Barkatullah University is a state public university in Bhopal, India. Originally known as the University of Bhopal, and informally as Bhopal University, it was renamed in 1988 after the freedom fighter Professor Maulavi Barkatullah, who was born in the area.  Barkatullah University has been accredited as a B category university by the National Assessment and Accreditation Council (NAAC).

History
The university was founded in 1970 as Bhopal University. It was renamed Barkatullah University in 1988. The university is a teaching and an affiliating institution. In 1974–75, the Institute of Open and Distance Education was established with the permission of UGC for distance education.

Campus

It is on the National Highway 12 which passes through Bhopal. It is a residential-type campus and, apart from the quarters for the vice-chancellor and the staff, there are four hostels for boys and a hostel for girls.

On the campus, there are buildings for departments such as the Institute of Physics and Electronics, Department of Pharmacy, University Institute of Technology, Management Institute, Department of Law, Psychology Department, etc. It houses an administrative building, a guest house, an auditorium and a playground.

The Barkatullah University, Bhopal has made available an exclusive area of 12 hectares (30 acres) out of the available 350 acres of land on the campus for building its instructional and administrative area. Presently the institute functions in buildings with a built up area of 9828 sq m. Moreover, construction of 7000 sq m for the instructional area and another 1000 sq m for workshop are being processed.

Additionally boarding facilities for 130 boys and 40 girls are available in the hostels on the campus. The institute shares facilities of the Health Center, the Computer Centre, Library, Sports and Games fields, Gymnasium, Cultural Hall & Auditorium, etc. Banking and Post Office facilities are available on the campus. An online testing facility for 60 students is in the institute for campus placement. Additionally, a state-of-the-art Computer Center with 60 clients, one Windows and one Unix server and broad band connectivity is on the institute premises. Allied facilities such as overhead projector, slide projector, Xeroxing M/c and fax m/c, is available. The entire campus is Wi-Fi enabled.

Barkatullah University Stadium is a proposed cricket stadium. The stadium will be on 35 to 40 acres of land with 440 meters of pavilion, 75 meter boundary with ten wickets and parking space of 50,000 vehicles.

Organisation and administration

Faculties
There are 10 faculties in the college and 23 teaching departments.
 Faculty of Arts
 Faculty of Commerce
 Faculty of Education
 Faculty of Physical Education
 Faculty of Law
 Faculty of Life Sciences
 Faculty of Management
 Faculty of Physical Sciences
 Faculty of Social Sciences
 Faculty of Engineering
 Institute of Open and Distance Learning
The courses are offered in the 64 government colleges and 159 private colleges that are affiliated to the university in the above-mentioned eight districts.

Colleges

Apart from the affiliated colleges, which are outside the university campus, the colleges of the university are on campus and are under the jurisdiction of Barkatullah University. The university runs its Engineering College (University Institute of Technology).

University Institute of Technology-Barkatullah University

University Institute of Technology (UIT) (Also known as Barkatullah University Institute of Technology- BUIT) is an autonomous institute (University Teaching Department) of Barkatullah University, Bhopal and is on its campus. The premises feature administrative and academic wings, a workshop, research laboratories, sports ground, gymnasium, health centre, yoga centre, dispensary, hostel (boys and girls), post office and bank.

The institute was established in 1997, following approval of the All India Council for Technical Education (AICTE). It offers undergraduate and postgraduate teaching programs in disciplines of technology and sciences. The institute has adopted internationally accepted Continuous Evaluation along with Credit and Grade Point Assessment System (CGPA) of evaluation for awarding the degrees.

The engineering college of Barkatullah University was established as College of Engineering in August 1997 with the approval of the All India Council for Technical Education in concurrence with the Government of Madhya Pradesh. The institute changed its name to UIT in 2000. After some time, it changed its name to Barkatullah University Institute of Technology (BUIT). This is a leading technological institute of central India.

BUIT offers UG, PG, PhD programmes in disciplines of engineering, technology and sciences.

Chakravarti Rajgopalachari Institute of Management
The management college of Barkatullah was set up in 1979. Chakravarti Rajgopalachari Institute of Management, or CRIM, offers a two-year full-time postgraduate programme in Management (MBA). Entry to this programme is regulated through a rigorous selection process conducted by VYAPAM and competitive business scenario.

Academics

Academic programmes
There are postgraduate courses, certificate courses, diploma courses, M.Phil. programmes, post-doctoral fellowship, etc. which meet regional and national needs. In addition to the conventional courses, the university offers several innovative and job-oriented courses at the postgraduate level. Most of these courses are non-traditional and interdisciplinary. There are 100 academic programmes, covering postgraduate and undergraduate courses. There are 26 self-financing courses offered.

Rajeev Gandhi Chair
Rajeev Gandhi Chair is horned by UGC to BU. The chair is working in the research field especially in tribal area and has submitted five Ph.D. theses. The chair is also doing research work on tribal technology. A first thesis on tribal technology was submitted by Vishal Massey under the guidance of Dr. S. N. Chaudhary. His topic was "Socio-cultural Consequences of Changing Technology" which he submitted in August 2010.

Affiliated colleges
Colleges that are affiliated belong to Bhopal, Harda, Hoshangabad, Raisen, Rajgarh, Sehore and Vidisha.

Notable alumni

Hassan Sheikh Mohamud, President of Somalia
Kailash Satyarthi, Nobel Peace Prize laureate, 2014
Pamposh Bhat, environmentalist and recipient of the Rajbhasha Award for Poetry
Rahat Indori, poet and Bollywood lyricist
Shivraj Singh Chouhan, 17th Chief Minister Of Madhya Pradesh
Chaudhary Rakesh Singh Chaturvedi, former minister, Government of Madhya Pradesh

See also
List of educational institutions in Bhopal
University Institute of Technology RGPV
Lakshmi Narain College of Technology

References

External links

Universities in Bhopal
Educational institutions established in 1970
1970 establishments in Madhya Pradesh